Karl Arliss Eyre (June 11, 1896 – September 4, 1964) was a Canadian politician. He represented the electoral district of Timmins in the House of Commons of Canada from 1949 to 1957 as a member of the Liberal Party.

Prior to his election to the House of Commons, Eyre served one term as Mayor of Timmins.

Electoral record

|-

|Liberal
|Karl EYRE
|align="right"|5,541 
 
|Co-operative Commonwealth
|Arnold PETERS
|align="right"| 4,686 
  
|Progressive Conservative
|Maurice BÉLANGER
|align="right"| 3,348 

|}

|-

|Liberal
|Karl EYRE
|align="right"| 7,949
 
|Co-operative Commonwealth
|Leo P. LALONDE
|align="right"|5,517 
  
|Progressive Conservative
|Percy BOYCE
|align="right"| 4,377

|}

External links
 

1896 births
1964 deaths
Liberal Party of Canada MPs
Members of the House of Commons of Canada from Ontario
Mayors of Timmins